David Hollwitz (born 20 March 1989 in Luckenwalde) is a German footballer who plays as a midfielder for SV Lichtenberg 47.

References

External links 
 

1989 births
Living people
Sportspeople from Luckenwalde
People from Bezirk Potsdam 
German footballers
Footballers from Brandenburg
Association football midfielders
3. Liga players
Regionalliga players
1. FC Union Berlin players
SV Babelsberg 03 players
FC Viktoria 1889 Berlin players